Cooks Run is a stream in the U.S. state of Ohio. It is a tributary to Rattail Branch.

Cooks Run was named in honor of a local family.

References

Rivers of Warren County, Ohio
Rivers of Ohio